Connor Gibbs (born February 2, 2001) is an American child actor. He is best known for his role as Aiden Lucas in the TV series Ghost Whisperer.

Filmography

References

External links

2001 births
21st-century American male actors
American male child actors
American male film actors
American male television actors
Living people
Male actors from California